Saadhu is a 1994 Indian Tamil-language action film written and directed by P. Vasu, starring Arjun and Raveena Tandon, with Vijayakumar, Goundamani and Radha Ravi in supporting roles. The film marked the debut of Tandon in Tamil cinema. It was released on 22 July 1994.

Plot 
Sathyamoorthy (Arjun) lives with his mother Kamalamma (Jayabharathi) and grandfather in the Boat Club area. Sathyamoorthy passes his degree in first class and becomes a gold medallist. Narayanan (Keerikkadan Jose), a notorious rowdy eyes on the property where Sathyamoorthy dwells. Narayanan's son threatens Sathyamoorthy and his family to get out. In the scuffle, Sathyamoorthy's grandfather dies. Sathyamoorthy and his mother are forced to relocate to Goyya Thoppu area by Narayanan. There, a tea shop worker inquires about them and says about the past. Earlier all shops Mamool was collected by Vibhuthi Veeramuthu (Radharavi) and Narayanan (Keerikkadan Jose) was working as his assistant. Then due to Narayanan becoming powerful, Veeramuthu planned to eliminate him. Narayanan  escaped and formed a separate faction and divided gang territory into two. The worker says that they are unable to go to home with full salary since rowdies will collect the money and also due to conflict between two gangs, the business is not going properly.
Sathyamoorthy and his mother live in upper portion of house where the lower portion is a brothel. Once a police raid occurs, the girls hide in the upper part of the house. Sathyamoorthy's mother is frightened and urges him to find a good job so that they can leave the area. Sathyamoorthy gets a good job and comes back with a Prasad from a temple. Narayanan's son harasses him. Sathyamoorthy goes to his mother and informs that he got a job. His mother is happy for him. A police officer is burnt to death in the locality allegedly by Veeramuthu. On returning home, he is informed that his mother has been admitted in hospital after she fell down the stairs. Sathyamoorthy goes to his employer for money for his mother's surgery. However a scuffle with Narayanan's son in a riot gets him arrested, he loses his money and the police Inspector Krishnamoorthi (Rajeev) frames him. He is released but is unable to save his mother.
The police inspector Krishnamoorthy realises Sathyamoorthy is innocent after arresting him on another theft case and the police commissioner (Kavitha) arranges a job in Mumbai. But Narayanan's son is furious that Sathyamoorthy had bashed him and tries to kill him but he himself is killed. Sathyamoorthy decides to join Rowdy Veeramuthu's gang to finish rowdyism. He encourages Veeramuthu to contest an election so that all ill-gotten money would be spent for people. Selvi (Raveena Tandon) is Veeramuthu's daughter who comes back after Sathyamoorthy convinces her. They develop a liking towards each other. Finally he beats and kills Narayanan. He learns from his master (Vijayakumar) that it was Veeramuthu who killed his mother. He gets injured in a fight with Narayan and is given electric shock by doctors fearing Veeramuthu. In a final election meeting, Sathyamoorthy snaps up from paralysed state and lectures people on electing good unselfish leaders. He is arrested for his deeds and Veeramuthu is also arrested.

In a parallel comedy subplot, Anjukolai Aarumugam (Goundamani) is feared as he has purportedly killed five people. But in reality he had stolen five coconuts. The goofy misinterpretation makes Goundamani a feared murderer, whereas he is in fact a timid person. He is recruited by Veeramuthu and provides some comic relief for the audience.

Cast 
 Arjun as Sathyamoorthy (Sakthi)
 Jayabharathi as Sathyamoorthy's mother
 Raveena Tandon as Selvi, Veeramuthu's daughter (Voice dubbed by K. R. Anuradha)
 Vijayakumar as Master
 Goundamani as Anjukolai Aarumugam/Aarukolai Aarumugam
 Radha Ravi as Vibhuthi Veeramuthu
 Rajeev as Police Inspector Krishnamoorthi
 Sethu Vinayagam as Minister Neelakandan
 Keerikkadan Jose as Narayanan
 Kavitha as Police commissioner
 Y. Vijaya as Narayanan's wife

Soundtrack 
The soundtrack was composed by Ilaiyaraaja, with lyrics by Vaali.

Reception 
Malini Mannath of The Indian Express wrote "Vasu has managed to infuse freshness in his screenplay and keeps the viewer's attention engaged for most of the time". R. P. R. of Kalki praised Arjun's performance and Rajiv's characterisation but panned the film for showing violence and then ending the film with message against non-violence.

References

External links 
 

1990s masala films
1990s Tamil-language films
1994 action films
1994 films
Films directed by P. Vasu
Films scored by Ilaiyaraaja
Indian action films